Army Reserve refers to a land-based military reserve force, including:
Army Reserve (Ireland)
Army Reserve (United Kingdom)
Australian Army Reserve
Canadian Army Reserve
New Zealand Army Reserve
United States Army Reserve
United States Navy Reserve
United States Air Force Reserve
United States Marine Corps Reserve